According to official government statistics, in 2021, the Philippine poverty rate rose to 18.1%, or roughly 19.99 million Filipinos, after the COVID-19 pandemic hampered years of government poverty reduction efforts; this was higher than the 16.6% or 17.67 million recorded in 2018 but lower than the 25.2% poverty rate recorded in 2012.

As of 2018, the rate of decline of poverty has been slower compared with other East Asian Countries, such as People's Republic of China (PRC), Thailand, Indonesia, or Vietnam. National Economic and Development Authority (NEDA) deputy director general Rosemarie Edillon attributed this to a generally low and stable inflation, improved incomes and higher employment rates during the period.

Background

, about 19.99 million Filipinos lived in poverty. Through various anti-poverty programs, such as the Comprehensive Agrarian Reform, Lingap Para sa Mahirap, and the Social Reform Agenda, the Philippines has been through a long battle to ameliorate that statistic. Despite these governmental efforts, the Millennium Development Goal milestone of reduction in poverty has been a slow process. The poor in the Philippines are most likely self-employed farmers, fisherfolk, or other agricultural workers. Three-quarters of these people live in severe disaster-risk areas that are highly rural. In 2015, about 58 percent of poor households have more than six members. Education overall has improved over time; from the ages of 15–24, over 75 percent have completed secondary education or above in 2015. Specifically in poor households, however, over 60 percent of families have education only up to elementary school.

The Philippines ranked 69th out of 121 countries in the Global Hunger Index of 2022, with the level of hunger described as "moderate". According to a 2018 study by the United Nations World Food Programme, while nearly all households in the Philippines can afford a diet that provides enough energy, only one third of the overall population can afford a diet that provides sufficient nutrients. Around 2.9 million Filipino families experienced hunger in the third quarter of 2022, according to a survey by the Social Weather Stations.

Out of the country's population of about 106 million, an estimated 4.5 million were homeless according to the Philippine Statistics Authority; of these 3 million were in the capital Manila.

As of 2022, the Bangsamoro Autonomous Region in Muslim Mindanao has the highest incidence of poverty in the country at 37.2% while Metro Manila has the lowest at 3.5%.

Children in the Philippines are particularly vulnerable to the effects of poverty and suffer high rates of mortality for those below 5 years old.

Causes of poverty 
Poverty has also been linked to bad governance, corruption, and a political system dominated by political dynasties. The country's poorest provinces are ruled by political dynasties.

Natural disasters have exacerbated poverty in the Philippines. Natural disasters in the Philippines have caused US$23 billion in damages since 1990, which continues to delay the development process. The frequent occurrences of typhoons cost the country lives, illness, malnutrition, and denial of education and health services. Filipino farmers are some of the most vulnerable, because floods and landslides severely affect their crops and income.

The poorest populations work in agriculture and live in areas prone to natural disasters compared to the wealthier population. There is an inadequate number of available good jobs, and a lack of investment in education that leads to such a high inequality of income. However, the government has plans focused on reducing poverty with objectives of improving the lives of the poorest segments of the population.

Recurring factors have slowed the development progress. GDP per capita in relation to the increase of population is much slower. A cause of poverty in the Philippines is the rise of unmanaged population growth. Because the poor tend to have bigger families, they are unable to access health services or sex education, which leads to more children and the continuation of that cycle. The pattern of growth is common in rural areas, but there has been a rise in poverty in urban areas. Cities in the Philippines have been faced with an increase in poverty due to lack of well-paid employment.

Comparison to other Southeast Asian countries 
According to data provided by the World Bank, economic growth in the Philippines competes sufficiently with the GDP per capita percent growth of neighboring countries; the Philippine GDP per capita in 2021 was $3,548.8 compared to 3,694.0 in Vietnam, and 4,291.8 in Indonesia. Declination of poverty is slower in the Philippines because urbanization and industrialization is progressing faster elsewhere. This advancement allows people to leave their agricultural-based work to a factory job with a higher paying income. The country has made movement out of the labor-intensive work in populous regions, such as Manila, however the country as a whole has made slower improvements. In addition to slow progress, natural disasters in the Philippines is one of the biggest conductors of poverty. While other countries are able to develop without consistent disturbances, the Philippines is forced to start from the ground up after every single occurrence.

The Economist stated that the Philippines' economic growth has been slow and that poverty reduction has lagged far behind China, Vietnam, and Thailand. Growth is also concentrated in Manila while other provinces in the country are neglected and hardly progress.

Poverty reduction

Poverty rate declines
According to the World Bank, poverty rates declined from 26.6 percent in 2006 to 21.6 percent in 2015. The country has attempted to increase income and opportunities and reverse impacts of occurring natural disasters. The Philippine Development Plan of 2017–2022 and the AmBisyon Natin 2040 are proposals for the nation to decrease poverty and improve the lives of the poorest population. These policies include creating more and better jobs, improving productivity, investing in health and nutrition, managing disaster risks, protecting the vulnerable, and more. These documents help set the overall goal of reducing poverty to 13–15 percent by 2022 and having the nation thrive at similar levels as surrounding countries. The strategic plans that the Philippine government has created are intended to work towards a middle-class society where poverty is reduced and living conditions are improved.

Drivers of poverty reduction 
The main drivers between 2006 and 2015 were an increase in wage income and movement of employment out of agriculture, government transfers, and remittance from domestic and foreign sources according to the World Bank publication, Making Growth Work for the Poor. Movement from agricultural jobs to lower-end industry jobs led to increase of wages and accounted for 50 percent of the reduction in poverty. The majority of farm workers and fishers have remained poor, according to the Philippine Statistics Authority.

Due to the Pantawid Pamilya, the government was able to use the social assistance which resulted in the contribution of 25 percent reduction of poverty as well as influence behavior change. Remittances from domestic and foreign sources accounted for 12 percent of the reduction in poverty. 

In addition, a factor of the declination of poverty is the growth of population. With a 1.7 percent increase of population a year has resulted in a 3.8 percent increase in per capita GDP growth. An additional factor is an increase of school enrollment and decrease of dropout rates. Despite a lack of distribution, the water, sanitation and electricity of the Philippines have also improved. Other socioeconomic indicators such as social safety nets and health insurance has also been beneficial factors. In addition, drivers of reduction also include the influx of economic expansion that has grown the economy.

Poverty rate increase during the COVID-19 pandemic 

According to government statistics, millions of Filipinos fell into poverty during the COVID-19 pandemic, due in part to lockdowns enacted to control the spread of the disease and possibly exacerbated by poor governance. From 2018 to 2021, amid the economic recession caused by the COVID-19 pandemic in the Philippines, an estimated 2.3 million people fell into poverty.

Definition 
As of 2022, the Philippine Statistics Authority has set the poverty threshold at PHP12,030 per month for a family of five, or PHP79 per day per person to spend on food and non-food requirements.

See also
 Street children in the Philippines
 Squatting in the Philippines

References

Further reading